The 1988–89 Liga Bet season saw Ironi Ashdod win their regional divisions and promoted to Liga Alef.

At the bottom, Beitar Kiryat Gat and Hapoel Yeruham (from South B division) were all automatically relegated to Liga Gimel.

South Division B

References
Liga Bet Finle Table, 1988-89, 
Liga Bet Table, 1988-89, images 

Liga Bet seasons
Israel
4